Richard Beck is an artist manager and former public relations man within the music industry. He runs Bigboy Management with a roster comprising RyanDan, 5ive, The Parlotones and Ezra Vine. He also presides over Supernova Entertainment Ltd, a live music and entertainment organisation. He has appeared on numerous TV shows and has been interviewed on the radio for his opinions.

PR, Promotions & Live Touring
Beck began his career in the music business in 1989 at the age of 17, working as an assistant engineer at the Basement Recording Studio in Wardour Street, London. After three months he was promoted to Studio Manager working across all sections of record production and administration.

Two years later he went on to become the youngest ever National Radio Promotions Executive when he joined the in-house promotions department at Chrysalis Records. Beck worked with acts including Sinéad O'Connor, Billy Idol, Monie Love, Debbie Harry and Kenny Thomas, and helped secure the Number One spot for Chesney Hawkes with the single "The One and Only".  Beck then joined UK concert & events promoter MCP as press and marketing manager, working with major names such as INXS, Guns N’ Roses, R.E.M., Oasis, Bon Jovi, Metallica, U2, Crowded House and Simply Red.

After three years at MCP, Beck moved to entertainment publicity company Laister Dickson (later LD Publicity) where he remained for 6 years, attaining director status. He worked on a variety of artists, celebrities and events including: Janet Jackson, Tina Arena, M People, BBMak, Capital FM’s ‘Party in the Park’ for The Prince’s Trust (3 Years), The BRIT Awards (5 Years), Songs & Vision (Wembley Stadium), The MTV Awards and The Rolling Stones ‘Voodoo Lounge’ and ‘Bridges To Babylon’ European tours.

In 1997, Beck headed the international launch of the then relatively unknown Canadian country artist Shania Twain. He put in place and executed the worldwide marketing and publicity campaign for her album Come On Over and the album sold 36 million copies, making it the 5th biggest selling album of all time and the biggest selling album ever by a female artist.

Management
In early 2001, after a decade working in music marketing, PR and promotion, Beck decided to gather his knowledge and apply it to management, teaming-up with Chris Morrison at CMO Management Int. The CMO stable hosts a range of artists including Blur, Gorillaz, Morcheeba and Ultravox & Live Aid legend, Midge Ure.  Beck set-up BIGBOY Management in 2002 bringing with him a clients including Shania Twain, Bruce Springsteen, Midge Ure and Mark Shaw (Then Jerico).

BIGBOY’s first new artist signing, Russian pop superstar Ani Lorak, sold 4 million copies of her debut album and is currently selling out 70,000 capacity venues in Europe. In May 2008, Ani came second in the Eurovision Song Contest, representing her native Ukraine.

In 2002/2003 Beck was invited by the BBC to be a judge on their 'Just up Your Street' TV talent show, a role for which he received critical acclaim.

Late 2004 saw Beck move to Australia for a one-year project, teaming-up with music impresario Ralph Carr to create one of the leading independent music organisations in Australia. Richard was the General Manager of all Entertainment and Music divisions, namely: RCM Artist Management, Standard Records, Standard Music Publishing and the newly created punk label illicit records. In 2006, Beck returned to the UK to concentrate again on his core business, artist management.

More recently, he has been interviewed on BBC Radio Five Live for his music industry opinions and also featured on a celebrity episode of Channel 4's long running property search show, 'A Place in the Sun'. He also featured extensively in the MTV documentary, '5ive Revived'.

In September 2009, Bigboy Management was merged into a new full-service entertainment company, Supernova Entertainment Ltd, of which Beck takes charge.

He has programmed and managed live music in venues (London's Clapham Grand & The Coronet) and is the promoter for Wheels & Fins festival (https://wheelsandfins.co.uk/).

References

External links
Supernova Entertainment

Living people
1970s births
British music managers